Leon Jerry "Jack" Guthrie (November 13, 1915 – January 15, 1948) was a songwriter and performer whose rewritten version of the Woody Guthrie song "Oklahoma Hills" was a hit in 1945. The two musicians were cousins.

Early life
Born in Olive, Oklahoma, he was a cousin of Woody Guthrie. He grew up around horses and musical instruments before the family moved to California in the mid-1930s, where he took on the nicknames "Jack", "Oklahoma", and "Oke". He competed in rodeo as a bucking-horse rider and in 1937 traveled with Woody to Los Angeles where they landed on The Oke & Woody Show on KFVD radio in Hollywood.

Career in music
Guthrie's rewritten version of a Woody Guthrie song "Oklahoma Hills" (Capitol 201) reached No. 1 in 1945, staying on the charts for 19 weeks. The b side, "I'm A Brandin' My Darlin' With My Heart", reached No. 5 later that year. At the time the record became a hit Jack Guthrie was in the U.S. Army and stationed in the Pacific Theater. As soon as he got out of the service he wrote and recorded more songs, played live gigs up and down the West Coast. In July 1947 he was admitted to a hospital with tuberculosis. He died in 1948 in Livermore, California.

Guthrie's style was influenced by Jimmie Rodgers and adapted to fit his cowboy image. Although the labels listed 'Jack Guthrie & His Oklahomans' as the artist, in reality Guthrie had no working band. The studio brought in some of its better musicians to back Guthrie. Many of them, like Porky Freeman, Red Murrell, Cliffie Stone, and Billy Hughes were recording artists in their own right.

Discography 

note: (*) also released as part of the 3-disc 78rpm album set Oklahoma Hills: Jack Guthrie Memorial Album (Capitol AC-76).

Compilations
 Oklahoma Hills (Bear Family BCD-15580, 1991)

See also
Oklahoma Hills

References

Bibliography
Whitburn, Joel. The Billboard Book of Top 40 Country Hits. Billboard Books, 2006.

External links
 Encyclopedia of Oklahoma History and Culture – Guthrie, Leon Jerry "Jack"

1915 births
1948 deaths
People from Creek County, Oklahoma
American country singer-songwriters
Country musicians from Oklahoma
Western swing performers
Yodelers
Jack
20th-century American singers
United States Army personnel of World War II
20th-century deaths from tuberculosis
Tuberculosis deaths in California
Singer-songwriters from Oklahoma